Mitchell Yap Gumabao Sr. (born 8 December 1956), better known as Dennis Roldan, is a Filipino former actor, basketball player, businessman, and congressman.

Career

Basketball
Before entering show business, he was a basketball player for Trinity College prior to being drafted to play for a short time with the Philippine Basketball Association's (PBA) Ginebra team and 1983 Gilbey's Gin Gimlets season team.

Film
He later appeared in the film Kambal Sa Uma in 1979, Salome in 1981 and Paradise Inn in 1985. He won an award at the Metro Manila Film Festival for Best Supporting Actor in the movie Hot Property in 1983. In the same year, Roldan portrayed a kidnapper in the box office bomb action film, Terrorist Hunter starring Eddie Garcia.

Politics
He was elected Quezon City councilor in 1988, and was elected Congressman from 1992 to 1995 in the 3rd District of Quezon City. He ran for a second term in 1995 but lost to Michael Defensor.

Personal life
Roldan is a Filipino of Chinese and Spanish ancestry. He is the older brother of actress Isabel Rivas. He is the father of actor Marco Gumabao and volleyball player Michele Gumabao. Roldan revealed that he made a "covenant" with God as a result of prison-based Bible studies and fellowship seminars. He has since become a born-again Christian. He has been a pastor of Jesus Christ the Life Giver Ministry, which is based in Quezon City.

On August 26, 2014, the Pasig Regional Trial Court found Roldan and two other persons guilty of kidnapping a Chinese-Filipino boy back in 2005. He is currently serving a life sentence.

Filmography

Film

Television
Rio Del Mar (1999–2001)
Saan Ka Man Naroroon (1999–2001)
Sa Dulo ng Walang Hanggan (2001–2003)
Sana Ay Ikaw Na Nga (2001–2003)
My Destiny (2014)

References

External links

1956 births
Living people
20th-century Filipino male actors
21st-century Filipino male actors
Barangay Ginebra San Miguel players
Basketball players from Quezon City
Filipino Christian religious leaders
Filipino male film actors
Filipino male television actors
GMA Network personalities
ABS-CBN personalities
Filipino men's basketball players
Filipino people of Chinese descent
Filipino people of Spanish descent
Filipino politicians convicted of crimes
Filipino sportsperson-politicians
Male actors from Metro Manila
Members of the House of Representatives of the Philippines from Quezon City
Nationalist People's Coalition politicians
People convicted of kidnapping
Prisoners sentenced to life imprisonment by the Philippines
Quezon City Council members